Run, Angel, Run! is a 1969 film directed by Jack Starrett and starring William Smith and Valerie Starrett. It was the 17th highest-grossing film of 1969.

Plot synopsis
When Angel writes a story about the Devil's Advocates motorcycle gang, his luck changes. The good news is he sells the story to a magazine for $10,000. The bad news is he is a wanted man, now hunted by the biker gang.

Cast
William Smith as Angel
Valerie Starrett as Laurie
Dan Kemp as Dan Felton
Gene Shane as Ron
Lee de Broux as Pappy
Eugene Cornelius as Space
Paul Harper as Chic

References

External links

 Valerie Starrett interview http://sixtiescinema.com/2012/07/10/valerie-starrett-this-angel-can-act-and-write/

1969 films
Films directed by Jack Starrett
Outlaw biker films
Films scored by Stu Phillips
1969 directorial debut films
1960s English-language films